Herculaneum Dock was part of the Port of Liverpool in Liverpool, England. It was at the south end of the Liverpool dock system, on the River Mersey. To the north it was connected to Harrington Dock. The dock was named after the Herculaneum Pottery Company that had previously occupied the site.

History
From 1767, a tidal basin in the area that would become the dock was used for unloading copper for a smelting works. Between 1794 and 1841 it was the site of a pottery. In 1864, a new dock designed by George Fosbery Lyster was blasted from the foreshore, providing two graving docks. This dock opened in 1866. Ten years later, a third graving dock was added.

Beginning in 1873, the dock handled petroleum. In 1878, specialist casemates were built to store this and other volatile cargo within the sandstone cliffs above. The dock continued in this capacity until the task of oil handling was transferred across the river to Tranmere Oil Terminal and Stanlow Oil Refinery. During 1881 the dock facility was enlarged further and a fourth graving dock was constructed in 1902.

Liverpool remained an important port during the Second World War, with Herculaneum Dock acting as a terminus for the North Atlantic Convoys.

Herculaneum Dock was formerly served by its own station on the Liverpool Overhead Railway. The station (and railway) closed on 30 December 1956. By 1958 demolition of the station had been completed.

In 1972, Herculaneum Dock closed being filled in during the 1980s to create a car park.

After closure
The area south of the dock contained a tank farm; this was reclaimed for the Liverpool Garden Festival and residential properties.

In 2004, the site was bought by national property developer David McLean Homes and a riverside residential development, called City Quay, Liverpool was built on the dock.

Since the closing of Herculaneum Dock, what was the main dock area is now a car park and where the graving docks were are now office buildings. The map of 1901 shows the entrance to the dock with the letter 'L'. A restaurant has since been built on this.

Images of Herculaneum Dock

References

Further reading

External links
 
 Site of Herculaneum Dock aerial photo

Liverpool docks
Redeveloped ports and waterfronts in Merseyside
History of Liverpool
1866 establishments in England